Lyne Shackelford Metcalfe (April 21, 1822 – January 31, 1906) was a U.S. Representative from Missouri.
Born in Madisonville, Kentucky, Metcalfe attended the common schools, Shurtleff College, Alton, Illinois, and Illinois College, Jacksonville, Illinois.
He engaged in mercantile pursuits in Alton, Illinois, in 1844.
He served as member of the board of aldermen of Alton.

Metcalfe was elected mayor of Alton.
During the Civil War served in the Union Army as assistant quartermaster with rank of captain and later promoted to colonel.
He moved to St. Louis, Missouri, in 1863.
He engaged in manufacturing.
He served in the city council of St. Louis.

Metcalfe was elected as a Republican to the Forty-fifth Congress (March 4, 1877 – March 3, 1879).
He was an unsuccessful candidate for reelection in 1878 to the Forty-sixth Congress.
He died in Kirkwood, St. Louis County, Missouri, January 31, 1906.
He was interred in Alton Cemetery.
Alton, Madison County, Illinois.

References

1822 births
1906 deaths
Quartermasters
Union Army colonels
Republican Party members of the United States House of Representatives from Missouri
People from Madison County, Missouri
19th-century American politicians